The 2009 Malone Pioneers football team represented Malone University in the 2009 NAIA football season.  The Pioneers played their home games in Fawcett Stadium.

Schedule

Coaching staff

Head coach
The head coach for the 2009 season was Mike Gardner, who was in his fourth season directing the Pioneers.  Previously he was head coach at Tabor College (where he returned to coach in 2010).  Gardner also worked as the defensive coordinator for the team.

Assistant coaches
Assistant coaches for the team were:
 Offensive Coordinator - Dustin Miller
 Offensive Line - Troy Schenk
 Running Backs - Cliff Schenk
 Defensive Backs - Allen Foster
 Wide Receivers - Nyrell Knight
 Defensive Line - Brian Landies
 Linebackers/Strength & Conditioning - Justin Murphy
 Running Backs - Denny Blake

References

Malone
Malone Pioneers football seasons
Malone Football